Stone Fruit is a graphic novel by Lee Lai, published May 11, 2021 by Fantagraphics. 

In 2022, the book won the Lambda Literary Award for Graphic Novel/Comics,was a Barbara Gittings Literature Award honor book, and a finalist for the Los Angeles Times Book Prize for Graphic Novel/Comics.

Reception 
Stone Fruit was generally well-received, including starred reviews from Booklist and Publishers Weekly.

Publishers Weekly applauded how Lai "skillfully captures the ways family dynamics and histories play out in romantic relationships, and how heavy those legacies can land," which results in "a poignant and mature rumination on how people change, and change each other, proving Lai a talent well worth watching." Terry Hong, writing for Booklist, called the novel a "jaw-dropping debut" with "stunning artistry," complementing by Lai's "complex narrative skills." Laura Olive Sackton, writing for the Chicago Review of Books, also applauded the novel, calling it "[a] remarkable contribution to this chorus of queer storytelling," saying the narrative is filled with "smart dialogue and character growth" and that through the illustration, Lai "literally draws transformation, and the feelings it evokes, onto the page."

The Guardian's Rachel Cooke provided a mixed review, calling Stone Fruit "[a] downbeat but moving exploration of the aftermath of a relationship." Cooke noted that while the book is affective, "you finish it with no hope at all that its characters will ever be able to resolve their difficulties. There is something intensely bleak at its centre."

References 

2021 graphic novels
21st-century Australian women artists
21st-century Australian women writers
2020s LGBT novels
English-language literature
Fantagraphics titles
LGBT-related graphic novels